Achada Fazenda is a settlement in the eastern part of the island of Santiago, Cape Verde. In 2010 its population was 2,592. It is situated near the east coast, 2 km southeast of Pedra Badejo, near the estuary of the Ribeira Seca (Lagoas de Pedra Badejo).

References

Villages and settlements in Santiago, Cape Verde
Santa Cruz, Cape Verde
Populated coastal places in Cape Verde